Sidney Charles Hutchison (26 March 1912 – 22 April 2000) was a British art historian, Secretary of the Royal Academy from 1968 to 1982.

References

1912 births
2000 deaths
British art historians
British curators